The Council of Ministers was the governmental organ in the Democratic Republic of Afghanistan (later the Republic of Afghanistan). The leader of the Council of Ministers chose ministers for the different ministerial posts in the country. Under the leadership of Nur Mohammad Taraki, Hafizullah Amin and Babrak Karmal the council underwent massive changes. Under the rule of Karmal, there were 20 out of 24 ministers that belonged to the Parcham faction and the remaining belonged to the Khalq faction. All Afghan ministers had seats in the council.

Cabinets 
Note: This list may be missing some ministerial seats

References 

Government ministers of Afghanistan
Democratic Republic of Afghanistan